Monopolizing may refer to:
 Monopolization, a crime under United States antitrust law
 The act of creating, maintaining, or using power derived from a monopoly
 Anti-competitive practices